Mutliate Me is an EP by Teenage Bottlerocket. It was released on April 12, 2011 on Fat Wreck Chords and recorded at The Blasting Room with Andrew Berlin. "Henchman", a Bad Religion cover, was recorded on August 30, 2010 with the intent of appearing on Germs of Perfection, a Bad Religion tribute put together by Spin Magazine, but it was not included on that compilation. The other two songs, "Mutilate Me" and "Punk House of Horror", were recorded on January 2, 2011 and were re-released on the band's next album Freak Out!.

It was released on vinyl in three versions: black and red vinyl, each with red lettering on the cover, and blue vinyl with blue lettering. It was also released to digital music stores.

Track listing

Personnel
 Kody Templeman – guitar, vocals
 Ray Carlisle – guitar, vocals
 Miguel Chen – bass
 Brandon Carlisle – drums
 Andrew Berlin – engineer, mixer

External links
 

2011 EPs
Fat Wreck Chords EPs
Teenage Bottlerocket albums